William Albert Earley (born January 30, 1956) is a former pitcher in Major League Baseball who played for the St. Louis Cardinals during the 1986 season. Listed at 6' 4", 200 lb., he batted right handed and threw left handed.

Career
Earley  was selected originally by the Kansas City Royals in the 11th round of the 1977 MLB Draft, but did not sign. He later played from 1978 through 1985 in the Chicago Cubs and Texas Rangers Minor League systems before joining the Louisville Redbirds of the American Association, the Cardinals highest affiliate team.

In 1986, Earley led the Redbirds with 15 saves (second in the league) in 52 pitching appearances (third in the league), while topping the league with 42 games finished. Overall, his 15 saves were the most by a Cardinal AAA pitcher since Mike Proly, who saved 17 games in 1975.

Besides, Earley played winter ball with the Leones del Caracas and Águilas del Zulia clubs of the Venezuelan League between the 1982 and 1984 seasons, as well as for the Indios de Mayagüez of the Puerto Rico League in the 1986 Caribbean Series.

References

External links

Baseball Gauge
Retrosheet

1956 births
Living people
Águilas del Zulia players
American expatriate baseball players in Mexico
Baseball players from Ohio
Geneva Cubs players
Indios de Mayagüez players
Iowa Cubs players
Leones del Caracas players
American expatriate baseball players in Venezuela
Louisville Redbirds players
Major League Baseball pitchers
Mexican League baseball pitchers
Miami RedHawks baseball players
Midland Cubs players
Oklahoma City 89ers players
Plataneros de Tabasco players
St. Louis Cardinals players
Wichita Aeros players
Elder High School alumni